Club Deportivo Híspalis is a Spanish football club from Seville founded in 1972. It is best known for its women's team, created in 1992, which currently plays in the Segunda División.

History
CD Híspalis was one of the eleven founding members of the reunified Superliga Femenina in 2002. For the first three seasons it ranked in the league's bottom half, but in 2004 it signed a collaboration with Sevilla FC to represent it in the Superliga, taking its name, crest and kit. Through this partnership it became one of the leading teams in the league, and in 2006 nearly won the championship; the team stood in the lead before the last round with a two-point advantage over RCD Espanyol, but drew 3–3 at defending champion Athletic Bilbao's ground and Espanyol won their match and claimed the league on goal difference.

Reaching the national cup's semifinals the following year was Híspalis last major success, as the team collapsed in the 2008 season, ending last and being thus relegated. Following the relegation Sevilla FC broke the partnership, creating its own team. This was a major blow for the club, which for the next four seasons never had promotion options, and in 2012 it was instead relegated to the third tier, having ended second to last in the table.

Season to season

Former internationals
  Priscila Borja
  Rosa Castillo
  Vanesa Gimbert
  Auxiliadora Jiménez
  Alexandra López
  Ana Romero

References

Women's football clubs in Spain
Association football clubs established in 1972
Sport in Seville
Sevilla FC
1972 establishments in Spain
Football clubs in Andalusia